The Signal Division  was a Directorate of the Admiralty Naval Staff responsible for policy, control and management of all naval communications from 1914 to 1964.

History
In 1906 the Admiralty set up a Signals Committee to initially investigate signaling between Royal Navy vessels and Merchant Navy vessels, in 1914 the Admiralty War Staff had established an expanded Signal Section  to deal with all shore to ship communications following the abolition of the war staff function. The Signal Division was established on the 18 August 1917  the divisions primary role was for receiving and sending signals to ships at sea and stations ashore, but also for the coding or cyphering of the signals. In September 1919 the division was renamed the Communications Division   until 1927 when it was again re-styled Signal Section still within the Naval Staff until 1941 when it reverted to Signal Division, it continued as a component part of the Naval Staff until 1964 when the Admiralty Department was abolished and replaced by a new Navy Department within the Ministry of Defence.

Responsibilities
As of August, 1917:

 The Signal Division will be responsible for all Naval, Mercantile, Allied and Naval & Military:-
 W/T Signalling (including the allocation of all W/T Call Signs other than "commercial").	
 S/T Signalling
 Visual Signalling (including allocation of all Pendants)
 Private and Recognition Signals
 Signal Books
 Codes
 Cyphers
 Methods of Drafting, Coding & Cyphering, and dealing with all messages (whether W/T, S/T, Visual, Land Line or Cable).
 "S" Orders
 "SR" Orders
 The Signal Division is not responsible for either Personnel or Materiel, but will act in an advisory capacity to the departments dealing therewith and should be consulted by them as necessary.
 All correspondence, and preparing, printing and "establishment" of all the necessary books and Instructions in connection therewith.

Directors of Division
Included:

First World War

Director Signal Section
 Rear-Admiral Sydney R. Fremantle, September, 1914 – July, 1915.
 Captain Christopher R. Payne, January, 1916 –  May, 1917.

Director Signal Division
 Captain Edward M. Phillpotts,  August, 1917 – December 1917.
 Acting Captain Richard L. Nicholson,  January, 1918 –  November, 1919.

Interwar

Director Communications Division
 Captain Rudolf M. Burmester: November 1919-April 1920 
 Captain Henry K. Kitson,  July, 1921 – February, 1923.
 Captain Raymond Fitzmaurice: February 1923-February 1925 
 Captain James F.Somerville: February 1925-February 1927

Director Signal Section
 Captain Charles E. Kennedy-Purvis: February 1927-March 1930 
 Captain James W.S.Dorling: March 1930-April 1932 
 Captain Arthur J. L. Murray: April 1932-September 1934 
 Captain Guy W.Hallifax: September 1934-October 1935 
 Captain W. Tofield Makeig-Jones: October 1935-September 1937 
 Captain Philip F. Glover: September 1937 – 1939

Second World War

Director Signal Division
 Captain Philip F. Glover: September 1940 – 1941
 Rear-Admiral Cedric S. Holland: March 1942-November 1943 
 Rear-Admiral Vaughan Morgan: November 1943-October 1945 
 Captain John R.S. Haines: October 1945-April 1947

Post War

Director Signal Division
 Captain Gilbert R. Waymouth: April 1947-September 1949 
 Captain Ralph G. Swallow: September 1949-December 1951 
 Captain Roy S. Foster-Brown: December 1951-February 1954 
 Captain Alwyn D. Lenox-Conyngham: February 1954-November 1955 
 Captain Robert F. T. Stannard: November 1955-November 1957 
 Captain Christopher A. James: November 1957-November 1959 
 Captain Edward T.L. Dunsterville: November 1959-March 1960 
 Captain W. John Parker: March 1960-November 1961 
 Captain John R.G. Trechman: November 1961-January 1965

Deputy Directors of Division
Included:
 Captain Patrick W.B. Brooking: August 1939-July 1941 
 Captain Francis J. Wylie: July 1941-March 1943 
 Captain Charles L. Firth: July 1941-May 1943 
 Captain Sir Philip W. Bowyer-Smith, Bt.: November 1941-October 1943 
 Captain J.Peter L. Reid: March 1943-December 1944 
 Captain Herbert F.H. Layman: February 1944 – 1945 
 Captain Charles L. Firth: December 1944-December 1945 
 Captain Laurence G. Durlacher: December 1945-March 1948 
 Captain Peter Dawnay: March 1948-March 1950 
 Captain Earl Cairns: March 1950-March 1952 
 Captain Edward T.L. Dunsterville: March 1952-March 1954 
 Captain Charles P. Mills: March 1954-April 1956 
 Captain Christopher A. James: April 1956-November 1957 
 Captain Robert R.B. Mackenzie: November 1957-December 1959 
 Captain Ian F. Sommerville: December 1959-February 1961 
 Captain the Hon. David P. Seely: February 1961-August 1963 
 Captain Douglas A. Poynter: August 1963-August 1965

References

Attribution
Primary source for this article is by Harley Simon, Lovell Tony, (2017), Signal Division (Royal Navy), dreadnoughtproject.org, http://www.dreadnoughtproject.org.

Sources
 Archives, The National. "Admiralty Signal Division: History", Vol 2. discovery.nationalarchives.gov.uk. National Archives, 1936 . ADM 116/3404.
 Archives, The National. "Records of Naval Staff Departments". discovery.nationalarchives.gov.uk. National Archives, 1883-1978, ADM Division 10. 
 Black, Nicholas (2009). The British Naval Staff in the First World War. Woodbridge: The Boydell Press. .
 Mackie, Colin, (2010-2014), British Armed Services between 1860 and the present day — Royal Navy - Senior Appointments, http://www.gulabin.com/.
 Rodger. N.A.M., (1979) The Admiralty (offices of state), T. Dalton, Lavenham, 
 Smith, Gordon (2014), British Admiralty, Part 2 - Changes in Admiralty Departments 1913-1920, Naval-History.Net.

External links

Admiralty departments
Admiralty during World War I
Admiralty during World War II
Royal Navy
1914 establishments in the United Kingdom
1964 disestablishments in the United Kingdom
Military history of the United Kingdom during World War II